Strumiany may refer to the following places:
Strumiany, Lesser Poland Voivodeship (south Poland)
Strumiany, Łódź Voivodeship (central Poland)
Strumiany, Masovian Voivodeship (east-central Poland)
Strumiany, Gostyń County in Greater Poland Voivodeship (west-central Poland)
Strumiany, Poznań County in Greater Poland Voivodeship (west-central Poland)
Strumiany, Lubusz Voivodeship (west Poland)
Strumiany, West Pomeranian Voivodeship (north-west Poland)